In mathematics and physics, the Christoffel symbols are an array of numbers describing a metric connection.  The metric connection is a specialization of the affine connection to surfaces or other manifolds endowed with a metric, allowing distances to be measured on that surface.  In differential geometry, an affine connection can be defined without reference to a metric, and many additional concepts follow: parallel transport, covariant derivatives, geodesics, etc. also do not require the concept of a metric. However, when a metric is available, these concepts can be directly tied to the "shape" of the manifold itself; that shape is determined by how the tangent space is attached to the cotangent space by the metric tensor. Abstractly, one would say that the manifold has an associated (orthonormal) frame bundle, with each "frame" being a possible choice of a coordinate frame. An invariant metric implies that the structure group of the frame bundle is the orthogonal group . As a result, such a manifold is necessarily a (pseudo-)Riemannian manifold. The Christoffel symbols provide a concrete representation of the connection of (pseudo-)Riemannian geometry in terms of coordinates on the manifold. Additional concepts, such as parallel transport, geodesics, etc. can then be expressed in terms of Christoffel symbols.

In general, there are an infinite number of metric connections for a given metric tensor; however, there is a unique connection that is free of torsion, the Levi-Civita connection. It is common in physics and general relativity to work almost exclusively with the Levi-Civita connection, by working in coordinate frames (called holonomic coordinates) where the torsion vanishes. For example, in Euclidean spaces, the Christoffel symbols describe how the local coordinate bases change from point to point.

Each entry of this  array is a real number. Under linear coordinate transformations on the manifold, the Christoffel symbols transform like the components of a tensor, but under general coordinate transformations (diffeomorphisms) they do not. Most of the algebraic properties of the Christoffel symbols follow from their relationship to the affine connection; only a few follow from the fact that the structure group is the orthogonal group  (or the Lorentz group  for general relativity).

Christoffel symbols are used for performing practical calculations. For example, the Riemann curvature tensor can be expressed entirely in terms of the Christoffel symbols and their first partial derivatives. In general relativity, the connection plays the role of the gravitational force field with the corresponding gravitational potential being the metric tensor.

The Christoffel symbols are named for Elwin Bruno Christoffel (1829–1900).

Note

The definitions given below are valid for both Riemannian manifolds and pseudo-Riemannian manifolds, such as those of general relativity, with careful distinction being made between upper and lower indices (contra-variant and co-variant indices). The formulas hold for either sign convention, unless otherwise noted.

Einstein summation convention is used in this article, with vectors indicated by bold font. The connection coefficients of the Levi-Civita connection (or pseudo-Riemannian connection) expressed in a coordinate basis are called Christoffel symbols.

Preliminary definitions

These can be used to define the metric tensor:

and its inverse:

which can in turn be used to define the dual basis:

This convention also leaves use of the symbol  unambiguously for the vierbein.

Definition in Euclidean space
In Euclidean space, the general definition given below for the Christoffel symbols of the second kind can be proven to be equivalent to:

Christoffel symbols of the first kind can then be found via index lowering:

Rearranging, we see that (assuming the partial derivative belongs to the tangent space, which cannot occur on a non-Euclidean curved space):

In words, the arrays represented by the Christoffel symbols track how the basis changes from point to point. If the derivative doesn't lie on the tangent space, the right expression is the projection of the derivative over the tangent space (see covariant derivative below). Symbols of the second kind decompose the change with respect to the basis, while symbols of the first kind decompose it with respect to the dual basis. In this form, it's easy to see the symmetry of the lower or last two indices:
 and 

The same numerical values for Christoffel symbols of the second kind also relate to derivatives of the dual basis, as seen in the expression:

which we can rearrange as:

General definition

Christoffel symbols of the first kind
The Christoffel symbols of the first kind can be derived either from the Christoffel symbols of the second kind and the metric,

or from the metric alone,

As an alternative notation one also finds

It is worth noting that .

Christoffel symbols of the second kind (symmetric definition)
The Christoffel symbols of the second kind are the connection coefficients—in a coordinate basis—of the Levi-Civita connection.
In other words, the Christoffel symbols of the second kind  (sometimes  or ) are defined as the unique coefficients such that

where  is the Levi-Civita connection on  taken in the coordinate direction  (i.e.) and where  is a local coordinate (holonomic) basis. Since this connection has zero torsion, and holonomic vector fields commute (i.e. ) we have

Hence in this basis the connection coefficients are symmetric:

For this reason, a torsion-free connection is often called symmetric.

The Christoffel symbols can be derived from the vanishing of the covariant derivative of the metric tensor :

As a shorthand notation, the nabla symbol and the partial derivative symbols are frequently dropped, and instead a semicolon and a comma are used to set off the index that is being used for the derivative.  Thus, the above is sometimes written as

Using that the symbols are symmetric in the lower two indices, one can solve explicitly for the Christoffel symbols as a function of the metric tensor by permuting the indices and resumming:

where  is the inverse of the matrix , defined as (using the Kronecker delta, and Einstein notation for summation) . Although the Christoffel symbols are written in the same notation as tensors with index notation, they do not transform like tensors under a change of coordinates.

Contraction of indices
Contracting the upper index with either of the lower indices (those being symmetric) leads to

where  is the determinant of the metric tensor. This identity can be used to evaluate divergence of vectors.

Connection coefficients in a nonholonomic basis
The Christoffel symbols are most typically defined in a coordinate basis, which is the convention followed here. In other words, the name Christoffel symbols is reserved only for coordinate (i.e., holonomic) frames. However, the connection coefficients can also be defined in an arbitrary (i.e., nonholonomic) basis of tangent vectors  by

Explicitly, in terms of the metric tensor, this is

where  are the commutation coefficients of the basis; that is,

The standard unit vectors in spherical and cylindrical coordinates furnish an example of a basis with non-vanishing commutation coefficients. The difference between the connection in such a frame, and the Levi-Civita connection is known as the contorsion tensor.

Ricci rotation coefficients (asymmetric definition)
When we choose the basis  orthonormal:  then . This implies that

and the connection coefficients become antisymmetric in the first two indices:

where

In this case, the connection coefficients  are called the Ricci rotation coefficients.

Equivalently, one can define Ricci rotation coefficients as follows:

where  is an orthonormal nonholonomic basis and  its co-basis.

Transformation law under change of variable

where the overline denotes the Christoffel symbols in the  coordinate system. The Christoffel symbol does not transform as a tensor, but rather as an object in the jet bundle.

For each point, there exist coordinate systems in which the Christoffel symbols vanish at the point.  These are called (geodesic) normal coordinates, and are often used in Riemannian geometry.

There are some interesting properties which can be derived directly from the transformation law.
 For linear transformation, the inhomogeneous part of the transformation (second term on the right-hand side) vanishes identically and then  behaves like a tensor.
The inhomogeneous terms depend only on how the coordinates are changed, but are independent of Christoffel symbol itself.
 If the Christoffel symbol is unsymmetric about its lower indices in one coordinate system i.e., then they remain unsymmetric under any change of coordinates. A corollary to this property is that it is impossible to find a coordinate system in which all elements of Christoffel symbol are zero at a point, unless lower indices are symmetric. This property was pointed out by Albert Einstein and Erwin Schrödinger independently.

Relationship to parallel transport and derivation of Christoffel symbols in Riemannian space
If a vector  is transported parallel on a curve parametrized by some parameter  on a Riemannian manifold, the rate of change of the components of the vector is given by

The condition is

which by the product rule expands to

This is same as the equation obtained by requiring the covariant derivative of the metric tensor to vanish in the General definition section. The derivation from here is simple. By cyclically permuting the indices  in above equation, we can obtain two more equations and then linearly combining these three equations, we can express  in terms of metric tensor.

Relationship to index-free notation

Here, the Einstein notation is used, so repeated indices indicate summation over indices and contraction with the metric tensor serves to raise and lower indices:

Keep in mind that  and that , the Kronecker delta.

The statement that the connection is torsion-free, namely that

is equivalent to the statement that—in a coordinate basis—the Christoffel symbol is symmetric in the lower two indices:

The index-less transformation properties of a tensor are given by pullbacks for covariant indices, and pushforwards for contravariant indices. The article on covariant derivatives provides additional discussion of the correspondence between index-free notation and indexed notation.

Covariant derivatives of tensors
The covariant derivative of a contravariant vector field with components  is

By corollary, divergence of a vector can be obtained as

The covariant derivative of a covector field  is

The symmetry of the Christoffel symbol now implies

for any scalar field, but in general the covariant derivatives of higher order tensor fields do not commute (see curvature tensor).

The covariant derivative of a type  tensor field  is

that is,

If the tensor field is mixed then its covariant derivative is

and if the tensor field is of type  then its covariant derivative is

Contravariant derivatives of tensors
To find the contravariant derivative of a vector field, we must first transform it into a covariant derivative using the metric tensor

Applications

In general relativity
The Christoffel symbols find frequent use in Einstein's theory of general relativity, where spacetime is represented by a curved 4-dimensional Lorentz manifold with a Levi-Civita connection. The Einstein field equations—which determine the geometry of spacetime in the presence of matter—contain the Ricci tensor, and so calculating the Christoffel symbols is essential. Once the geometry is determined, the paths of particles and light beams are calculated by solving the geodesic equations in which the Christoffel symbols explicitly appear.

In classical (non-relativistic) mechanics
The metric (here in a purely spatial domain) can be obtained from the line element . Substituting the Lagrangian  into the Euler-Lagrange equation, we get

When Cartesian coordinates can be adopted (as in inertial frames of reference), we have an Euclidean metrics, the Christoffel symbol vanishes, and the equation reduces to Newton's second law of motion. In curvilinear coordinates (forcedly in non-inertial frames, where the metrics is non-Euclidean and not flat), fictitious forces like the Centrifugal force and Coriolis force originate from the Christoffel symbols, so from the purely spatial curvilinear coordinates.

In earth surface coordinates

Given a spherical coordinate system, which describes points on the earth surface (approximated as an ideal sphere).

Positive  is the northern hemisphere. To simplify the derivatives, the angles are given in radians (where d sin(x)/dx = cos(x), the degree values introduce an additional factor of 360 / 2 pi).

The related metric tensor has only diagonal elements (the squared vector lengths). This is an advantage of the coordinate system and not generally true.

Now the necessary quantities can be calculated. Examples:

The resulting Christoffel symbols of the second kind  then are (organized by the "derivative" index  in a matrix):

These values show how the tangent directions (columns: ,) change, seen from an outside perspective (e.g. from space), but given in the tangent directions of the actual location (rows: ,).

 The new north direction  changes by -R dθ in the up (R) direction. So the north direction will rotate downwards towards the center of the earth.
 Similarly, the up direction  will be adjusted towards the north.
 Moving north, the east tangent vector  changes its length (-tan(θ) on the diagonal), it will shrink (-tan(θ) dθ < 0) on the northern hemisphere, and increase (-tan(θ) dθ > 0) on the southern hemisphere.
Nevertheless, it can affect distances, physics equations, etc. So if e.g. you need the exact change of a magnetic field pointing approximately "south", it can be necessary to also correct your measurement by the change of the north direction using the Christoffel symbols to get the "true" (tensor) value.

The Christoffel symbols of the first kind  show the same change using metric-corrected coordinates, e.g. for derivative by :

See also
Basic introduction to the mathematics of curved spacetime
Differentiable manifold
List of formulas in Riemannian geometry
Ricci calculus
Riemann–Christoffel tensor
Gauss–Codazzi equations
Example computation of Christoffel symbols

Notes

References 
 
 
 
 
 
 
 
 
 
 
 
 
 

Riemannian geometry
Lorentzian manifolds
Mathematical notation
Mathematical physics
Connection (mathematics)